George Gigauri or Giorgi Gigauri is a UN official and senior humanitarian, serving as the Chief of Mission of the International Organization for Migration (IOM), the UN Migration Agency, in Iraq.

He is also the Coordinator of the United Nations Network on Migration and Co-Chair of the UN Durable Solutions Taskforce.

International Organization for Migration (United Nations)

Iraq
Giorgi Gigauri took up his appointment as the Chief of Mission of the International Organization for Migration (IOM), the UN Migration Agency, in Iraq in October 2021.

Bangladesh
At IOM Bangladesh, he was overseeing a programme portfolio, which includes humanitarian emergencies, with primary focus on the Rohingya crisis, migrant protection, policy and governance, migration and development, and economic reintegration.

He was one of the three Co-Chairs, with UNHCR and the UN Resident Coordinator, of the Strategic Coordination Group (SEG) which oversees and manages the 2015 Rohingya refugee crisis response in Bangladesh, which is the largest refugee camp in the world. He was also the Coordinator of the United Nations Migration Network that brings together key UN agencies and civil society partners working on migration policy and development in the country.

Since March 2020, he was the IOM Crisis Management Team Leader for the COVID-19 pandemic public health emergency programmes and the UN Inter-Agency Co-Lead for Points of Entry operations in the country.

Papua New Guinea
George Gigauri served as the IOM Chief of Mission in Papua New Guinea from 2013 - 2016, leading programmes in disaster management, community stabilization, and border management. 
He led IOM crisis response during the devastating drought in 2015–16 in the Highlands, joint counter human trafficking operation in the Dogleg area of Papua New Guinea (Torres Straights), and various peacebuilding initiatives in local conflict affected areas of the country.

Other Countries
During his tenure as the IOM Deputy Chief of Mission in Indonesia, he spearheaded a humanitarian effort leading to release of thousands of refugees from detention across the country.
His prior assignments include Head of Programme Support in Ukraine, Project Development Officer in Moldova, and research support at the Regional Office in Austria. He has led numerous emergency response surge teams in Asia-Pacific, including in Fiji, Tonga, and Vanuatu.

Education
Dr. George Gigauri received a PhD in Political Science in 2015 and holds an MSc (Distinction) in Migration Studies from University of Oxford. 
He speaks English, Georgian, and Russian.

Other
He is a contributor to international publications, including The Daily Star, The Bangkok Post, UN Migration Weblog, etc.

George Gigauri was inaugurated as an honorary tribal chief in Oro, Papua New Guinea in 2014.

In 2003 he founded the first Oxford University Georgian Society.

He is the son of Professor Vladimir Gigauri, who conducted the first artificial heart implant in the Soviet Union

References

Living people
People from Georgia (country)
United Nations officials
Alumni of St Antony's College, Oxford
Year of birth missing (living people)